Michael Chang defeated Stefan Edberg in the final, 7–5, 0–6, 6–4 to win the singles tennis title at the 1993 Cincinnati Masters. 

Pete Sampras was the defending champion, but lost in the semifinals to Edberg.

Seeds

  Pete Sampras (semifinals)
  Jim Courier (second round)
  Stefan Edberg (final)
  Michael Stich (quarterfinals)
  Ivan Lendl (second round)
  Petr Korda (second round)
  Michael Chang (champion)
  Richard Krajicek (second round)
  Goran Ivanišević (first round, retired)
  Andrei Medvedev (third round)
  Todd Martin (first round)
  Alexander Volkov (third round)
  Cédric Pioline (second round)
  Wayne Ferreira (third round)
  MaliVai Washington (second round)
  Henrik Holm (second round)

Draw

Finals

Top half

Section 1

Section 2

Bottom half

Section 3

Section 4

References

External links
 ITF tournament editions

Singles